Brod is a rural locality (a village) in Asovskoye Rural Settlement, Beryozovsky District, Perm Krai, Russia. The population was 107 as of 2010. There are 4 streets.

Geography 
It is located 5.5 km north-west from Asovo.

References 

Rural localities in Beryozovsky District, Perm Krai